Victoria Beckham (stylised as VB) is the debut and, to date, only studio album by English singer Victoria Beckham. It was released on 1 October 2001 by Virgin Records. Beckham was the last member of the Spice Girls to release a solo album. The album's lead single, "Not Such an Innocent Girl" was released on 17 September 2001. The second single, "A Mind of Its Own" was released on 11 February 2002. "I Wish" was set to be the album's third single as it was being promoted, but following the announcement of Beckham's second pregnancy, the single was shelved and was never  materialised. 

The album was a commercial failure internationally, reaching number ten in the United Kingdom and number twenty on the Australian Hitseekers Albums Chart.

Release
Initially, the album was to be titled Innocent Girl and set to be released on 27 August 2001, but was released on 1 October. Beckham revealed that she felt she had "a lot to prove" with the album's release: "When I started recording this album, I had a lot to prove. I want to prove I can sing and dance and have a vision. I'm really baring my soul on this. I hope people like it. When I was with the other girls I never did a lot of the singing, so this is the first time that people are going to see me and what I am capable of". She added that she hoped the album would do well "and I can have a successful solo career".

The album does not include the True Steppers hit "Out of Your Mind", on which Beckham features along with Dane Bowers, but it spawned two singles, "Not Such an Innocent Girl" and "A Mind of Its Own" which both debuted and peaked at number six on the UK Singles Chart.

Singles
"Not Such an Innocent Girl" was released on 17 September 2001 as the lead single from the album. In the United Kingdom, the single faced competition in a hugely hyped chart battle with Kylie Minogue's single "Can't Get You Out of My Head". On the chart date of 29 September 2001, "Not Such an Innocent Girl" debuted at number six on the UK Singles Chart with first week sales of 35,000 units, while "Can't Get You Out of My Head" debuted at number one with first week sales of 306,000 units. It has sold about 80,263 copies altogether, becoming the 163rd best seller of 2001.

The music video has a futuristic theme and features two Victorias: one dressed in all-white with blonde hair ("the good girl"), and the other in all-black with jet black hair ("the bad girl"). The video culminates into a "dance-off" and motorcycle race between the two Victorias.

"A Mind of Its Own" was released on 11 February 2002 as the second single from her debut self-titled solo album (2001). It peaked and debuted at number six on the UK Singles Chart and sold 56,570 becoming the 173rd best seller of 2002. There is a French version of the song called "Mon cœur n'en fait qu'à sa tête" (an adaptation of the title into French, or "my heart does what it wants to do").

A third single, "I Wish", was promoted but never materialised. The single version was a remix featuring Robbie Craig, and was performed on TV on Friday Night's All Wright. Following the announcement of Beckham's second pregnancy, the single was shelved. Beckham was dropped by Virgin Records along with fellow Spice Girls Emma Bunton and Melanie B, but a statement from her publicist denied reports, claiming: "No-one has been dropped. The Virgin deal has come to a natural end and both parties have decided not to continue."

Chart performance
Victoria Beckham faced a chart battle during the album's release week with Kylie Minogue's Fever. Both singers had previously faced a battle in the singles' chart, when their singles were released on the same day. However, Beckham's album debuted at number ten on the UK Albums Chart on 13 October 2001, whilst Minogue's album topped the charts. Victoria Beckham charted for three weeks on the chart. As of January, 2020 the album has sold 54,000 copies overall in the United Kingdom. After Being Victoria Beckham, an official documentary that aired in March 2002, the album re-entered the UK Albums Chart at number sixty-seven.

Critical reception

Upon its release, the album received mixed to negative reviews. BBC Music described the album as "a mish-mash affair of gushy sentiment and wishy-washy RnB" whilst NME called the album "a new low in shameless pop slaggery".

Track listing
Credits adapted from the liner notes of Victoria Beckham.

Charts

Certifications and sales

References

2001 debut albums
Albums produced by the Underdogs (production team)
Victoria Beckham albums
Virgin Records albums